Peristylus, sometimes commonly known as ogre orchids or bog orchids is a genus of flowering plants from the orchid family, Orchidaceae. It consists of over 100 known species found across much of eastern and southern Asia as well as in Australia and on many islands of the Indian and Pacific Oceans.

Description
Orchids in the genus Peristylis are terrestrial, perennial, deciduous, sympodial herbs with paired fleshy tubers and thread-like, unbranched roots. The stems are upright and unbranched. The leaves are arranged in a rosette at the base of the plants or near the centre of the stem. The flowers are resupinate, usually small, often crowded, white, green or yellowish and usually only last a few days. The dorsal sepal and petals overlap to form a hood over the column. The labellum has a spur and usually three lobes which may be short or long and threadlike. The distinguishing feature of the genus is the presence of two club-shaped projections on the stigma. In many respects, plants in this genus are similar to those in Habenaria, only differing in the structure of the column.

Taxonomy and naming
The genus Peristylus was first formally described in 1825 by Carl Ludwig Blume and the description was published in Bijdragen tot de flora van Nederlandsch Indië . The genus Peristylus is derived from the Greek words peri meaning 'around', and stylos 'column', referring to the arms on each side of the column.

Distribution
Orchids in the genus  Peristylus are found in Japan, China, Mongolia, India, Indochina, Indonesia, Philippines, Malaysia, the Philippines, Indonesia, New Guinea, Polynesia and Australia.

Species
, the World Checklist of Selected Plant Families accepted the following species:

 Peristylus affinis (D.Don) Seidenf. – Himalaya to S. China and Indo-China
 Peristylus aliformis (C.Schweinf.) Renz & Vodonaivalu – Fiji
 Peristylus alpinipaludosus (P.Royen) Schuit. & de Vogel – W. New Guinea
 Peristylus aristatus Lindl. – Indian Subcontinent to Myanmar
 Peristylus balaenolabium Ormerod – Sumatera
 Peristylus balakrishnanii Karthig., Sumathi & Jayanthi – S. Andaman Islands
 Peristylus banfieldii (F.M.Bailey) Lavarack – N. & N.E. Queensland
 Peristylus biermannianus (King & Pantl.) X.H.Jin – Central & E. Himalaya
 Peristylus bismarckiensis (Schltr.) P.F.Hunt – Papua New Guinea
 Peristylus brachypyhllus A.Rich. – S. India
 Peristylus brassii Ormerod – W. New Guinea
 Peristylus brevicalcar Carr – Borneo (Gunung Kinabalu)
 Peristylus brevilobus Thwaites – Sri Lanka
 Peristylus calcaratus (Rolfe) S.Y.Hu – E. Nepal, S. China to Vietnam, Taiwan
 Peristylus carnosipetalus Kurzweil – N. Thailand
 Peristylus carolinensis (Schltr.) Tuyama – Caroline Islands
 Peristylus chapaensis (Gagnep.) Seidenf. – N. Vietnam
 Peristylus chlorandrellus D.L.Jones & M.A.Clem. – Queensland
 Peristylus ciliatus Carr – Borneo (Gunung Kinabalu)
 Peristylus ciliolatus J.J.Sm. – New Guinea
 Peristylus citrinus (Thouars) Lindl. – Mascarenes
 Peristylus commersonianus Lindl. – Réunion
 Peristylus constrictus (Lindl.) Lindl. – Indian Subcontinent to Indo-China
 Peristylus cryptostylus (Rchb.f.) Ormerod – Society Islands
 Peristylus cubitalis (L.) Kraenzl. – India to Myanmar
 Peristylus cymbochilus Renz – Papua New Guinea
 Peristylus densus (Lindl.) Santapau & Kapadia – Indian Subcontinent to S. China, S. Korea, S. Central & S. Japan to Nansei-shoto
 Peristylus djampangensis J.J.Sm. – Jawa
 Peristylus elbertii J.J.Sm. – Lesser Sunda Islands
 Peristylus flexuosus (Thouars) S.Moore – Mascarenes
 Peristylus formosanus (Schltr.) T.P.Lin – Central Nansei-shoto to Taiwan
 Peristylus gardneri (Hook.f.) Kraenzl. – Sri Lanka
 Peristylus goodyeroides (D.Don) Lindl. – Tropical & Subtrop. Asia
 Peristylus gracilis Blume – Assam to Taiwan (Lan Yü) and Malesia
 Peristylus grandis Blume – Thailand (Ko Tarutao) to New Guinea
 Peristylus hallieri J.J.Sm. – Borneo
 Peristylus hamiltonianus (Lindl.) Lindl. – Central & E. Himalaya to Thailand
 Peristylus hatusimanus T.Hashim. – Japan (Kyushu)
 Peristylus holochila (Hillebr.) N.Hallé – Hawaiian Islands
 Peristylus holttumianus Seidenf. ex Aver. – S. Vietnam
 Peristylus holttumii Seidenf. – S. Indo-China to Peninsula Malaysia
 Peristylus hylophiloides Ormerod – Philippines
 Peristylus intrudens (Ames) Ormerod – Central Nepal, Indo-China, China (Hong Kong), C. Taiwan, Philippines (Luzon)
 Peristylus iyoensis Ohwi – E. Nepal, N. Thailand, S. Korea, S. Central & S. Japan, Central & S. Taiwan
 Peristylus jinchuanicus K.Y.Lang – China (W. Sichuan, N.W. Yunnan)
 Peristylus kerrii Seidenf. – N. Thailand
 Peristylus kinabaluensis Carr – Borneo (Gunung Kinabalu)
 Peristylus korinchensis Ridl. – Sumatera
 Peristylus kumaonensis Renz – W. Himalaya
 Peristylus lacertifer (Lindl.) J.J.Sm. – Central Himalaya to S. Japan and W. Malesia
 Peristylus lancifolius A.Rich. – S. India
 Peristylus latilobus J.J.Sm. – E. Jawa
 Peristylus lawii Wight – Himalaya to India
 Peristylus listeroides (Schltr.) P.F.Hunt – New Guinea
 Peristylus lombokensis J.J.Sm. – Lesser Sunda Islands
 Peristylus macer (Schltr.) P.F.Hunt – New Guinea
 Peristylus maculifer (C.Schweinf.) Renz & Vodonaivalu – Vanuatu, Fiji (Vanua Levu)
 Peristylus maingayi (King & Pantl.) J.J.Wood & Ormerod – S. Indo-China to N. Queensland
 Peristylus minimiflorus (Kraenzl.) N.Hallé – New Caledonia (Î. des Pins), Futuna, Cook Islands
 Peristylus minimus Kurzweil & Tripetch – Thailand
 Peristylus monticola (Ridl.) Seidenf. – Andaman Islands, Malesia to New Guinea
 Peristylus mucronatus J.J.Sm. – Maluku (Seram)
 Peristylus nanus (Schltr.) P.F.Hunt – New Guinea
 Peristylus norumbus Ormerod – Papua New Guinea
 Peristylus novoebudarum F.Muell. – S.W. Pacific
 Peristylus nymanianus Kraenzl. – New Guinea
 Peristylus ovariophorus (Schltr.) Carr – Borneo (Sarawak)
 Peristylus pachyneuroides Renz – Papua New Guinea
 Peristylus pachyneurus (Schltr.) P.F.Hunt – New Guinea
 Peristylus palawensis (Tuyama) Tuyama – Caroline Islands
 Peristylus parishii Rchb.f. – Indian Subcontinent to S. China and Indo-China
 Peristylus phuwuanensis Kurzweil – N.E. Thailand
 Peristylus plantagineus (Lindl.) Lindl. – India, Sri Lanka
 Peristylus ponerostachys (Rchb.f.) Ormerod – Philippines (Leyte, Mindanao)
 Peristylus prainii (Hook.f.) Kraenzl. – Central Himalaya to Indo-China
 Peristylus pseudophrys (King & Pantl.) Kraenzl. – Sikkim (Chungthang)
 Peristylus reticulatus (Ames) Ormerod – Philippines (Luzon: Mt. Pulogloko)
 Peristylus richardianus Wight – E. Nepal, S. India
 Peristylus rigidus Kurzweil – N. Thailand
 Peristylus rindjaniensis J.J.Sm. – Lesser Sunda Islands
 Peristylus sahanii Kumar, G.S.Rawat & Jalal – N.E. India
 Peristylus secundus (Lindl.) Rathakr. – S. India
 Peristylus setifer Tuyama – Caroline Islands
 Peristylus silvicola (Schltr.) P.F.Hunt – New Guinea
 Peristylus societatis (Drake) N.Hallé – Society Islands
 Peristylus spathulatus J.J.Sm. – Borneo
 Peristylus spiralis A.Rich. – S.W. India, Sri Lanka
 Peristylus staminodiatus J.J.Sm. – Sulawesi
 Peristylus stenodon (Rchb.f.) Kores – Vanuatu
 Peristylus stocksii (Hook.f.) Kraenzl. – W. India
 Peristylus subaphyllus (Gagnep.) Seidenf. – Cambodia
 Peristylus tentaculatus (Lindl.) J.J.Sm. – S. China to Hainan
 Peristylus tenuicallus Ormerod – Vietnam
 Peristylus timorensis (Ridl.) J.J.Wood & Ormerod – Lesser Sunda Islands
 Peristylus tipulifer (C.S.P.Parish & Rchb.f.) Mukerjee – India (Kerala), Central Himalaya to China (Yunnan) and Indo-China
 Peristylus tobensis J.J.Sm. – N. Sumatera
 Peristylus tradescantiifolius (Rchb.f.) Kores – Maluku to S.W. Pacific
 Peristylus triaena (Schltr.) P.F.Hunt – New Guinea to Solomon Islands
 Peristylus tricallosus J.J.Sm. – Sulawesi
 Peristylus trimenii (Hook.f.) Abeyw. – Sri Lanka
 Peristylus umbonatus (Schltr.) P.F.Hunt – New Guinea
 Peristylus unguiculatus J.J.Sm. – Borneo
 Peristylus wheatleyi P.J.Cribb & B.A.Lewis – Vanuatu
 Peristylus whistleri P.J.Cribb – Samoa

See also
 List of Orchidaceae genera

References

Berg Pana, H. 2005. Handbuch der Orchideen-Namen. Dictionary of Orchid Names. Dizionario dei nomi delle orchidee. Ulmer, Stuttgart

External links

Peristylus in Australia
IOSPE orchid photos, Peristylus affinis 
Flowers of India, Stocks's Peristylus, Peristylus stocksii 
Phyto Images, Peristylus, 9 images
Orchidiana, Peristylus copelandii

 
Orchideae genera
Orchideae
Taxa named by Carl Ludwig Blume